Backhand is a stroke used in racquet sports and other sports, including:
 Tennis 
 pickleball
 Ice Hockey

Backhand, Back hand, Back-hand or Backhanded may also refer to:

 Back Hand, a 1975 album by American jazz musician Keith Jarrett
 Backhand, a type of shot in ice hockey
 Backhand (comics), a superhero in the Marvel universe
 Backhanded apology, a Non-apology apology
 Backhanded compliment, an insult disguised as a compliment
 Backhanded slap, a slap using the back of the hand as opposed to the palm

See also
 Backhander (disambiguation)